Vasudeva Das Lilley Nuñez (born 22 November 1995), commonly known as Vas Nuñez, is a Hong Kong professional footballer who currently plays as a centre-back for Chinese Super League club Dalian Pro.

Club career
Núñez joined Eastern in 2015, and was loaned to Metro Gallery for the 2015–16 season.

He scored his first professional goal for Metro Gallery on 6 March 2016, in a 2–3 away loss to Wong Tai Sin.

On 4 July 2017, R&F announced that they had acquired Núñez from Eastern. On 14 October 2020, Núñez left the club after his club's withdrawal from the HKPL in the new season.

In February 2021, it was reported that Núñez would join China League One club Meizhou Hakka.

On 21 August 2022, Núñez joined Dalian Pro. He contributed an assist in his second start for the club, helping his club to secure a 2-2 draw against Beijing Guoan on 24 September 2022.

International career
On 4 May 2018, Núñez was granted the Hong Kong SAR Passport. He was then called up to the U-23 squad for the 2018 Asian Games.

On 11 July 2022, Núñez was named in the preliminary squad in preparation for the 2022 EAFF E-1 Football Championship.

On 19 July 2022, Núñez made his international debut for Hong Kong in the 2022 EAFF E-1 Football Championship against Japan.

Personal life
Núñez was born in Hong Kong to a British father and Mexican mother.

Career statistics

Club

Notes

International

References

External links

1995 births
Living people
Hong Kong people of British descent
Hong Kong people of Mexican descent
Hong Kong footballers
Hong Kong international footballers
Association football defenders
Hong Kong Premier League players
China League One players
Chinese Super League players
Dreams Sports Club players
Eastern Sports Club footballers
R&F (Hong Kong) players
Meizhou Hakka F.C. players
Dalian Professional F.C. players
Hong Kong expatriate sportspeople in China
Hong Kong expatriate footballers
Expatriate footballers in China
Footballers at the 2018 Asian Games
Asian Games competitors for Hong Kong